Brinkumer SV is a German association football club, based in the town of Stuhr, which was founded in 1924. They play their home games at the BSV Arena. They currently participate in the Bremen-Liga.

Honours
The club's honours:
 Bremen-Liga
 Champions: 2009
 Landesliga Bremen
 Champions: 2003

Former players

References

External links
  

Football clubs in Germany
Football clubs in Lower Saxony
1924 establishments in Germany
Association football clubs established in 1924